Poroshino is the name of several rural localities in Russia:
Poroshino, Altai Krai, a selo in Poroshinsky Selsoviet of Kytmanovsky District in Altai Krai; 
Poroshino, Bryansk Oblast, a settlement in Ormensky Rural Administrative Okrug of Vygonichsky District in Bryansk Oblast; 
Poroshino, Ivanovo Oblast, a village in Pestyakovsky District of Ivanovo Oblast; 
Poroshino, Kirov, Kirov Oblast, a selo under the administrative jurisdiction of Pervomaysky City District of the City of Kirov in Kirov Oblast; 
Poroshino, Afanasyevsky District, Kirov Oblast, a village in Pashinsky Rural Okrug of Afanasyevsky District in Kirov Oblast; 
Poroshino, Penza Oblast, a selo in Titovsky Selsoviet of Pachelmsky District in Penza Oblast
Poroshino, Pskov Oblast, a village in Palkinsky District of Pskov Oblast
Poroshino, Ryazan Oblast, a village in Oskinsky Rural Okrug of Klepikovsky District in Ryazan Oblast
Poroshino, Udmurt Republic, a village in Karsovaysky Selsoviet of Balezinsky District in the Udmurt Republic
Poroshino, Babayevsky District, Vologda Oblast, a village in Borisovsky Selsoviet of Babayevsky District in Vologda Oblast
Poroshino, Vologodsky District, Vologda Oblast, a village in Markovsky Selsoviet of Vologodsky District in Vologda Oblast
Poroshino, Yaroslavl Oblast, a village in Bekrenevsky Rural Okrug of Yaroslavsky District in Yaroslavl Oblast